Cigar tree is a common name for species in the genus Catalpa that are native to North America, and may refer to:

 Catalpa bignonioides, native to the southeastern United States
 Catalpa speciosa, native to the midwestern United States